Erik Zabel (born 7 July 1970) is a German former professional road bicycle racer who raced most of his career with Telekom. With 152 professional wins and 211 wins in his career, he is considered by some to be one of the greatest German cyclists and cycling sprinters of all time. Zabel won a record nine points classifications in grands tours including the points classification in the Tour de France six consecutive years between 1996 and 2001 and the points classification in the Vuelta a España in 2002, 2003 and 2004. Zabel won the Milan–San Remo four times and numerous six-day track events. He was one of the few road cyclists of recent times who raced all year, including track cycling in winter. For season 2012 he joined  as sprint coach. He previously held that same position with the  team until their dissolution. Zabel admitted to doping from 1996 to 2004. He is the father of cyclist Rick Zabel.

Early life and amateur career

Zabel grew up in East Berlin, in the borough Marzahn. His father Detlev was a professional cyclist. His first international success as a junior was at the track world championship when he was third in the team pursuit on the East German team. In 1988 he was fifth in the points race. In 1989, as a 19-year-old, he was included in the East German national track team for professionals. That year he became national champion of East Germany in the individual pursuit.

After the Fall of the Berlin Wall he moved to Dortmund and became part of the amateur team RC Olympia Dortmund, led by Hennes Junkermann. He was second at the first national road championship of re-unified Germany in 1991, first at the regional championship of North Rhine-Westphalia and was included in the amateur German team for the World Championship in August. In 1992 he made name as a strong sprinter, winning the green jersey in the Peace Race and taking several stage wins in stage races. In July he was fourth in the road race of the 1992 Olympic Games in Barcelona, where he won the sprint of the peloton.

Professional career

1993–1995: The early years
In late 1992 he turned professional with the small German team Union-Frondenberg, before changing in 1993 to Team Telekom where he further developed as a sprinter. On 27 April 1994 Zabel tested positive for clostebol metabolites in Veenendaal–Veenendaal. He was fined 3000 Swiss francs and lost 50 points. A suspension on probation was cancelled. Later that year he won Paris–Tours in a mass sprint, his first win in a classic race.

In 1995 he won two stages on the Tour de France, his first success on a grand tour.

1996–1999: Green jerseys and classics victories

In 1996 he won again two stages in the Tour de France and won the points classification. He took over the green jersey in the 10th stage and wore it until the end of the Tour. That year his Telekom team took first and second place in the general classification as well, with Bjarne Riis and Jan Ullrich respectively.

In 1997 Zabel won his first monument classic, Milan–San Remo. He was the only sprinter in a group of forty to make it to the finish and easily won the sprint. Later that year, he won three stages on the Tour de France and secured his second green jersey.

In 1998 he won Milan–San Remo a second time and became national road champion of Germany. He won his third green jersey in the Tour de France, however this time without a stage victory.

In 1999 he was second in Milan–San Remo, winning the peloton sprint behind Andrei Tchmil who had broken clear in the final kilometer and managed to maintain his effort. He won the important German semi-classic Rund um den Henninger Turm in Frankfurt and won his fourth consecutive green jersey, equalling Sean Kelly's record, again without winning a stage.

2000–2002: World number one
In 2000 he won two legs of the UCI Road World Cup in spring: Milan–San Remo a third time and a surprise win in the Amstel Gold Race, beating Michael Boogerd in a bunch sprint. In the summer he won an unprecedented fifth green jersey, thereby surpassing Kelly's previous record. At the end of the year, he was the best overall in the World Cup and number two on UCI World Ranking.

In 2001 he won Milan–San Remo a fourth time, the most since cycling legend Eddy Merckx, earning him the nickname Signore Milano-Sanremo in Italy. He won the points classification in the Tour de France a sixth consecutive time, winning three stages furthermore. Zabel's unique streak of six green jerseys was owed to his all-round ability: he was one of the strongest sprinters, but could also climb reasonably well. This meant that, apart from taking the lead in the general classification in the Tour de France thanks to time bonuses, he could pick up further victories when other sprinters had retired and take the green jersey (as symbol for the leader of the points classification) to Paris. One memorable victory in securing the green jersey was in the 2001 Tour de France, when his competition with Australian Stuart O'Grady lasted from the first week until the final stage in Paris, where Zabel's better placing took the green jersey off O'Grady's shoulders. Later that summer, he also won the HEW Cyclassics, Germany's biggest one-day classic, and his seventh World Cup race. In September he won three stages, consecutive, in the Vuelta a España and was fifth in the World Championship road race in Lisbon.

2001 turned out to be his most successful year ever. At the end of the year, he had won 29 races and was number one on the closing standings of the world ranking.

In 2002 he missed the breakaway in Milan–San Remo but won Rund um den Henninger Turm a second time. In the summer, he failed to win a seventh consecutive green jersey in the Tour de France. He won one stage victory, his twelfth in total, but was ultimately beaten by Australian Robbie McEwen in the final points classification. He won the points classification in the Vuelta a España instead, without winning a stage. In Zolder, in Belgium, he finished third at the World championship in a peloton sprint behind Mario Cipollini and Robbie McEwen. At the end of the year, he maintained his number one position on the world ranking.

Zabel would have retroactively been awarded the Vélo d'Or for his performances of 2000 and 2001, but after Lance Armstrong was stripped of the titles in 2012–2013, as with each other races, the 2nd-place finisher was not promoted to 1st.

2003–2005: Vuelta success and podium places

In 2003 he became national road champion of Germany for a second time, but failed to win a stage in the Tour de France and was third in the final points classification. He won two stages in the Vuelta and again won the points classification of the race. In October he won Paris–Tours for the second time in his career and was awarded the unofficial Ruban Jaune for winning the race in a record average speed for a one-day race of 47.55 km per hour. The record stood until 2010 when Óscar Freire won Paris–Tours riding at an average of speed of 47.73 km per hour. He ended the year as number two on the world ranking behind Paolo Bettini.

In 2004 Zabel began the season losing what would have been his fifth Milan–San Remo. He looked secure to win the sprint, but lifted his arms to celebrate too early and was ultimately foiled by Óscar Freire. He was third in the points classification of the Tour de France and first in the Vuelta points classification, but despite numerous second and third places, he didn't win a stage. His first place in the Vuelta was also his ninth win in a points classification of a grand tour, an all-time record. At the 2004 Olympics in Athens, he was again fourth in the road race, again winning the sprint behind three escapees and so missing an olympic medal twelve years after Barcelona. In October, after 9 victories and 18 second places throughout the season, he ended the year as he had begun it: second behind Freire, this time in the world championship in Verona.

In 2005 Zabel became the first to win Rund um den Henninger-Turm in Frankfurt a third time, in his first win on the season. In May he participated for the first time in his career in the Giro d'Italia, seeking the only points classification he had not yet won, but failed to win a stage and was sixth in the points ranking. His Telekom Team, keen on winning the Tour de France with Jan Ullrich, decided not to include him in the selection for that year's Tour, much to the discontent of Zabel, who declared at the start of the HEW Cyclassics that he would be leaving the team at the end of the year. He rode the Vuelta, but was unable to win a stage or the points classification despite multiple second places behind Alessandro Petacchi, and played no role in the World Championship in Madrid. In October he won Paris–Tours a third time, equalling the record in the classic of Gustave Danneels, Paul Maye and Guido Reybrouck.

2006–2008: Team Milram
At 35, Zabel left his team Telekom after 13 years, and signed on for the Italian-German team Milram in 2006, where he teamed up with Alessandro Petacchi. Petacchi was considered the fastest sprinter in the world by then and would focus on an Italian program, but the Italian broke his knee in the Giro, making Zabel the leader of the team that season. He had to wait until 24 May to take his first win of the season, a stage in the Bayern Rundfahrt. In the Tour, he was the team leader in the absence of a GC contender, and was ultimately second in the points classification, but his best stage results were two third places. In the Vuelta he won two stages, his first ProTour wins in 2006, before heading to the world championship. In Salzburg, he finished second in a three-man sprint with Paolo Bettini and Alejandro Valverde, his third podium finish in the world championships.

In 2007 he won two stages in the Bayern Rundfahrt and one in the Tour de Suisse. He was again captain in the team selection for the Tour de France, after Alessandro Petacchi had been suspended for a positive salbutamol test. He wore the green jersey one day, was twice second and once third in a stage, but was third once more in the final points classification. In July he won one stage in the Deutschland Tour, his 13th in total, and won the race's points classification for the seventh time. In September he won the seventh stage in the Tour of Spain, ahead of world champion Bettini, totalling eight stage victories in the Vuelta throughout his career.

In 2008 he won one race, a stage win in the Tour of Valencia early in the season. In his last participation in the Tour de France, at age 38, he was once more third in the final points classification. In September 2008 Zabel stated he would retire the following month after 16 years as a professional cyclist with 209 professional road victories and many more podium finishes. In December 2008 he joined the Columbia team as an advisor, to work alongside riders such as Mark Cavendish, André Greipel and Mark Renshaw.

Doping confession
On 24 May 2007, Zabel and former Team Telekom teammate Rolf Aldag admitted using EPO to prepare for the 1996 Tour de France. Zabel told at a press conference he experimented with it for a week and stopped due to side effects. He apologized for lying about using EPO in the past. His confession was triggered by accusations by former Team Telekom masseur Jef d'Hont and the confessions of Bert Dietz, Udo Bölts and Christian Henn, all former members of Team Telekom. D'Hont's book, of which excerpts were printed in the German political magazine Der Spiegel in April 2007, accused members of Team Telekom of systematic doping with EPO in the mid-1990s.

His name was also on the list of doping tests published by the French Senate on 24 July 2013 that were collected during the 1998 Tour de France and found positive for EPO when retested in 2004. As a result, Zabel was suspended from his coaching role with Team Katusha and resigned his membership of the UCI's Professional Cycling Council.

Days later, Zabel finally admitted to sueddeutsche.de and revealed the level of his truth-bending. He told the German publication that he actually used the substance between 1996 and 2003, as well as other banned products and methods. "EPO, cortisone, then even blood doping: it is still a big deal", he said.

Major results

1992
 4th Road race, Olympic Games
1993
 7th Overall Tirreno–Adriatico
1st Stage 1
1994
 1st Paris–Tours
 1st Classic Haribo
 Tour de l'Avenir
1st  Points classification
1st Stages 2, 5, 7 & 8
 Vuelta a Aragón
1st Stages 2, 3 & 5
 7th Omloop Het Volk
1995
 1st Six Days of Munich (with Etienne De Wilde)
 Tour de France
1st Stages 6 & 17
 Tour de Suisse
1st Stages 2 & 3
 1st Stage 1 Tirreno–Adriatico
 1st Stage 2 Vuelta a Aragón
 3rd Continentale Classic
 3rd Overall Four Days of Dunkirk
1st Stages 1 & 7
 7th Overall Vuelta a Andalucía
 8th Gent–Wevelgem
 9th Scheldeprijs
1996
 1st Rund um Köln
 1st Six Days of Dortmund (with Rolf Aldag)
 1st Continentale Classic
 Tour de France
1st  Points classification
1st Stages 3 & 10
 Setmana Catalana de Ciclisme
1st Stages 1, 2 & 4
 1st Stage 2 Four Days of Dunkirk
 1st Stage 2 Tour de Luxembourg
 1st Stage 3 Vuelta a Andalucía
 1st Stage 5 Ronde van Nederland
 5th Scheldeprijs
 6th Rund um den Henninger Turm
1997
 1st  Overall Vuelta a Andalucía
1st Stage 1
 1st Milan–San Remo
 1st Scheldeprijs
 1st Trofeo Luis Puig
 1st Continentale Classic
 Tour de France
1st  Points classification
1st Stages 3, 7 & 8
 Bayern Rundfahrt
1st Stages 2 & 4
 1st Stage 1 Tour de Suisse
 1st Stage 1 Tour de Luxembourg
 1st Stage 3 Volta a la Comunitat Valenciana
 1st Stage 4 Ronde van Nederland
 3rd Road race, National Road Championships
1998
 1st  Road race, National Road Championships
 1st Milan–San Remo
 Tour de France
1st  Points classification
Held  after Stage 2
 Tirreno–Adriatico
1st  Points classification
1st Stages 2, 7 & 8
 Bayern Rundfahrt
1st Stages 1 & 4
 Vuelta a Aragón
1st Stages 4 & 5
 1st Stage 1 Volta a la Comunitat Valenciana
 1st Stage 2 Route du Sud
 1st Stage 4 Tour de Luxembourg
 2nd Continentale Classic
 6th Gent–Wevelgem
 10th Rund um den Henninger Turm
1999
 1st  Points classification, Tour de France
 1st Rund um den Henninger Turm
 1st Sparkassen Giro Bochum
 1st Continentale Classic
 Volta a Catalunya
1st Stages 4 & 5
 Bayern Rundfahrt
1st Stages 2 & 4
 Tour Down Under
1st Stages 2 & 4
 1st Stage 1 Vuelta a Aragón
 1st Stage 2 Volta a la Comunitat Valenciana
 1st Stage 6 Deutschland Tour
 2nd Milan–San Remo
 2nd Scheldeprijs
 3rd Road race, National Road Championships
 9th HEW Cyclassics
2000
 1st  Overall UCI Road World Cup
 1st Milan–San Remo
 1st Amstel Gold Race
 1st Trofeo Luis Puig
 1st Six Days of Dortmund (with Rolf Aldag)
 Tour de France
1st  Points classification
1st Stage 20
 Deutschland Tour
1st  Points classification
1st Stages 2, 5 & 8
 Volta a Catalunya
1st Stages 2 & 3
 Setmana Catalana de Ciclisme
1st Stages 3 & 4
 1st Stage 1 Vuelta a Andalucía
 1st Stage 2 Bayern Rundfahrt
 1st Stage 3a Rheinland-Pfalz Rundfahrt
 1st Stage 4 Tirreno–Adriatico
 1st Stage 4 Volta a la Comunitat Valenciana
 1st Stage 5 Tour Down Under
 2nd Trofeo Cala Millor
 3rd Paris–Roubaix
 3rd Trofeo Andratx-Mirador d'Es Colomer
 4th Tour of Flanders
 4th HEW Cyclassics
 7th Scheldeprijs
2001
 1st Milan–San Remo
 1st HEW Cyclassics
 1st Trofeo Luis Puig
 1st Six Days of Dortmund (with Rolf Aldag)
 1st Six Days of Munich (with Silvio Martinello)
 Tour de France
1st  Points classification
1st Stages 1, 3 & 19
 Vuelta a España
1st Stages 2, 3 & 4
 Bayern Rundfahrt
1st  Points classification
1st Stages 3, 4, 5 & 6
 Deutschland Tour
1st  Points classification
1st Stages 2, 3 & 8
 Tour de Suisse
1st  Points classification
1st Stages 1 & 8
 1st Stage 2 Volta a la Comunitat Valenciana
 1st Stage 3 Vuelta a Andalucía
 2nd Road race, National Road Championships
 2nd Continentale Classic
 3rd Paris–Tours
 5th Road race, UCI Road World Championships
 9th Gent–Wevelgem
2002
 1st Rund um den Henninger Turm
 1st  Points classification, Vuelta a España
 1st  Points classification, Tirreno–Adriatico
 Tour de France
1st Stage 6
Held  after Stage 3
Held  after Stages 1–9 & 11–12
 Deutschland Tour
1st  Points classification
1st Stages 1, 2, 5 & 7
 Tour de Suisse
1st  Points classification
1st Stages 2 & 8
 Ronde van Nederland
1st  Points classification
1st Stage 1
 Setmana Catalana de Ciclisme
1st Stages 1 & 2a
 1st Stage 1 Tirreno–Adriatico
 1st Stage 1 Tour de Luxembourg
 1st Stage 2 Vuelta a Aragón
 1st Stage 6 Bayern Rundfahrt
 3rd  Road race, UCI Road World Championships
 3rd Road race, National Road Championships
 3rd Paris–Tours
 3rd Trofeo Cala Millor
 3rd Trofeo Luis Puig
 9th Gent–Wevelgem
 9th Amstel Gold Race
 10th Overall Vuelta a Andalucía
1st  Points classification
 10th Tour of Flanders
2003
 1st  Road race, National Road Championships
 1st Paris–Tours
 Vuelta a España
1st  Points classification
1st Stages 10 & 11
 Setmana Catalana de Ciclisme
1st Stages 1 & 5
 1st Stage 1 Deutschland Tour
 1st Stage 3 Ronde van Nederland
 1st Stage 3 Vuelta a Murcia
 1st Stage 4 Bayern Rundfahrt
 2nd Rund um den Henninger Turm
 3rd Trofeo Cala Millor
 4th Sparkassen Giro Bochum
 5th Scheldeprijs
 5th Grand Prix Pino Cerami
 6th Milan–San Remo
 6th HEW Cyclassics
 8th Overall Tirreno–Adriatico
2004
 1st Rund um Köln
 1st  Points classification, Vuelta a España
 Bayern Rundfahrt
1st  Points classification
1st Stages 2 & 5
 1st Stage 5 Vuelta a Andalucía
 2nd  Road race, UCI Road World Championships
 2nd Milan–San Remo
 2nd Trofeo Cala Millor
 3rd Overall Tirreno–Adriatico
 4th Road race, Olympic Games
 4th Trofeo Luis Puig
 7th HEW Cyclassics
 7th Rund um den Henninger Turm
 7th Challenge Illes Balears
2005
 1st Paris–Tours
 1st Rund um den Henninger Turm
 1st Six Days of Munich (with Robert Bartko)
 1st Six Days of Dortmund (with Rolf Aldag)
 3rd Road race, National Road Championships
 4th Tour of Flanders
 4th Trofeo Alcudia
 5th Challenge Illes Balears
 9th Gent–Wevelgem
2006
 1st Six Days of Munich (with Bruno Risi)
 1st Six Days of Dortmund (with Bruno Risi)
 1st SixDayNight Büttgen (with Bruno Risi) 
 1st  Points classification, Deutschland Tour
 Vuelta a España
1st Stages 4 & 21
 1st Stage 1 Bayern Rundfahrt
 2nd  Road race, UCI Road World Championships
 2nd Overall Tour of Qatar
 2nd Vattenfall Cyclassics
 3rd Giro della Provincia di Lucca
 3rd International Grand Prix Doha
 3rd Sparkassen Giro Bochum
 4th Rund um den Henninger Turm
 5th Milano–Torino
 8th Brabantse Pijl
2007
 Bayern Rundfahrt
1st  Points classification
1st Stages 2 & 3
 Deutschland Tour
1st  Points classification
1st Stage 3
 1st Stage 7 Vuelta a España
 1st Stage 1 Tour de Suisse
 5th Overall Niedersachsen Rundfahrt
 5th Vattenfall Cyclassics
 6th Milan–San Remo
 7th Scheldeprijs
 Tour de France
Held  after Stage 5
2008
 1st Six Days of Dortmund (with Leif Lampater)
 1st Stage 2 Volta a la Comunitat Valenciana
 2nd Road race, National Road Championships
 2nd Münsterland Giro
 4th Gent–Wevelgem
 4th Scheldeprijs
 7th Paris–Tours
2009
 1st Six Days of Berlin (with Robert Bartko)
 1st Six Days of Bremen (with Leif Lampater)
 1st Six Days of Dortmund (with Leif Lampater)

Classic results timeline

See also
 List of doping cases in sport
 List of doping cases in cycling

References

External links

1970 births
Living people
Cyclists at the 1992 Summer Olympics
Cyclists at the 1996 Summer Olympics
Cyclists at the 2000 Summer Olympics
Cyclists at the 2004 Summer Olympics
Doping cases in cycling
German sportspeople in doping cases
German cycling road race champions
German male cyclists
German Tour de France stage winners
German Vuelta a España stage winners
Tour de Suisse stage winners
Olympic cyclists of Germany
Cyclists from Berlin
UCI Road World Cup winners
UCI Road World Rankings winners
East German male cyclists
People from East Berlin